Jenkins Airport  is a public use airport located one nautical mile (2 km) west of the central business district of Wyoming, a town in Kent County, Delaware, United States. It is privately owned by Joe C. Jenkins.

Facilities and aircraft 
Jenkins Airport covers an area of 60 acres (24 ha) at an elevation of 53 feet (16 m) above mean sea level. It has two runways with turf surfaces: 18/36 is 2,842 by 70 feet (866 x 21 m) and 12/30 is 2,035 by 70 feet (620 x 21 m).

For the 12-month period ending December 1, 2011, the airport had 1,400 general aviation aircraft operations, an average of 116 per month. At that time there were 20 aircraft based at this airport: 90% single-engine, 5% multi-engine, and 5% glider.

See also 
 List of airports in Delaware

References

External links 
  at Delaware DOT website
 Aerial image as of March 1992 from USGS The National Map
 

Airports in Kent County, Delaware